Sam Tseng (born January 29, 1968) is a Taiwanese television host and actor.

Tseng graduated from Shih Hsin School of Journalism and entered the entertainment scene in 1990 as an actor. His career took off during the late nineties, when he began hosting treasure hunting game show Golden Legend with Lillian Wang, and variety show Taiwan Homerun, alongside Hsu Nai-lin.

In addition to his television work, he has appeared in many well-received stage productions by Ping-Fong Acting Troupe and Godot Theatre Company.

In 2005, he married Kate Liu, a Chinese Australian who is ten years his junior. The couple have a son and a daughter.

Filmography

Host

Variety show

Event

Television series

Film

Theater

Published works

Awards and nominations

References

External links
 
 
 
 

1968 births
Living people
Taiwanese male television actors
Taiwanese male film actors
Taiwanese male stage actors
21st-century Taiwanese male actors
People from Pingtung County
Taiwanese television presenters
20th-century Taiwanese male actors
Shih Hsin University alumni
Taiwanese people of Hakka descent